Bherkund is a village and union council (an administrative subdivision) of Mansehra District in Khyber-Pakhtunkhwa province of Pakistan. It is located in Mansehra Tehsil, between the cities of Mansehra and Oghi.

Bherkund is about 7 km away from the city Mansehra on the Oghi road. It is on the bank of river Siren which falls into Indus river after 30 km from here.

References

Union councils of Mansehra District
Populated places in Mansehra District